Xiajin County is a county in the northwest of Shandong Province, China, bordering Hebei to the west. It is the westernmost county-level division of the prefecture-level city of Dezhou. Its economy is mostly agricultural, including cotton, wheat, and corn.

Administrative divisions
As 2012, this County is divided to 2 subdistricts, 10 towns and 2 townships.
Subdistricts
Yincheng Subdistrict
Beicheng Subdistrict

Towns

Townships
Dukouyi Township
Tianzhuang Township

References

Counties of Shandong
Dezhou